Jeanne H. Freeland-Graves is an American nutritionist, currently the Bess Heflin Centennial Professor at University of Texas at Austin.

References

Year of birth missing (living people)
Living people
American women nutritionists
American nutritionists
University of Texas at Austin faculty
Rutgers University alumni